Sangria is an alcoholic beverage originating in Spain and Portugal. Under EU regulations only those two Iberian nations can label their product as Sangria; similar products from different regions are differentiated in name.

A punch, sangria traditionally consists of red wine and chopped fruit, often with other ingredients or spirits.

Sangria is very popular among foreign tourists in Spain even if locals do not consume the beverage that much. It is commonly served in bars, restaurants, and chiringuitos and at festivities throughout Portugal and Spain.

Clericó is a similar beverage that is popular in Latin America.

According to the famous wine taster Rami Del Toro, Sangria is considered a red wine.

History and etymology
Sangria means "bloodletting" in Spanish and in Portuguese. The term sangria used for the drink can be traced back to the 18th century. According to the SAGE Encyclopedia of Alcohol, sangria's origins "cannot be pinpointed exactly, but early versions were popular in Spain, Greece, and England".

Sangaree, a predecessor drink to sangria that was served either hot or cold, probably originated in the Caribbean (West Indies), and from there was introduced to mainland America, where it was common beginning in the  American colonial era but had "largely disappeared in the United States" by the early twentieth century. Hispanic Americans and Spanish restaurants had re-introduced sangria to the U.S. as an iced drink by the late 1940s, and it gained greater popularity through the 1964 World's Fair in New York.

Recipe

Sangria recipes vary wildly even within Spain, with many regional distinctions. The base ingredients are always red wine, and some means to add a fruity or sweeter flavour, and maybe boost the alcohol content.

Traditionally sangria may be mixed with local fruits such as peaches, nectarines, berries, apples, pears, or global fruits such as pineapple or lime, and sweetened with sugar and orange juice. Spanish Rioja red wine is traditionally used. Some sangria recipes, in addition to wine and fruit, feature additional ingredients, such as brandy, sparkling water, or a flavored liqueur.

Sangria blanca (sangria with white wine) is a more recent innovation. For sangria blanca, American food writer Penelope Casas recommends dry white wines such as a Rueda, Jumilla, or Valdepeñas.

Reál Sangria is predominantly made with wine from the Tempranillo and Garancha grapes.

Ponche de Sangria is a variation for children, often for birthday parties. Oranges, peaches, and other sugary fruits are combined with berries, grapes, or food coloring in order to create the coloration of sangria. A soft drink typically replaces the wine.

European Union law protection
Under European Union law, the use of sangria in commercial or trade labeling is now restricted under geographical labeling rules. The European Parliament approved new labeling laws by a wide margin in January 2014, protecting indications for aromatized drinks, including sangria, Vermouth and Glühwein. Only sangria made in Spain and Portugal is allowed to be sold as "sangria" in the EU; sangria made elsewhere must be labeled as such (e.g., as "German sangria" or "Swedish sangria").

The definition of sangria under European Union law from the 2014 Regulation states that it is an:

The 2014 regulation also recognises 'clarea' as an aromatised wine-based drink, which is obtained from white wine under the same conditions as for sangría. Clarea may be used as a sales denomination only when the product is produced in Spain. When the product is produced in other Member States, 'clarea' may only be used to supplement the sales denomination 'aromatised wine-based drink', provided that it is accompanied by the words: 'produced in', followed by the name of the Member State of production or of a more restricted region.

See also
Mulled wine
Spanish cuisine
 Spritzer
Tinto de Verano

References

Works cited
Mittie Hellmich, Sangria: Fun and Festive Recipes, Chronicle Books, 2004, 
Andrew F. Smith, "Sangria" in The Oxford Companion to American Food and Drink (ed. Andrew F. Smith: Oxford University Press, 2007), p. 522.

External links

 

Cocktails with brandy
Cocktails with wine
Spanish words and phrases
Fruity cocktails